Tagetes parryi is a Mesoamerican species of marigold in the family Asteraceae. It has been found only in the State of San Luis Potosí in northeastern Mexico.

Tagetes parryi is a branching perennial herb up to 30 cm (12 inches) tall. Leaves are pinnately compound with 5-7 leaflets. The plant produces one flower head per flower stalk, yellow, each head containing 8 ray florets surrounding numerous disc florets.

References

External links

parryi
Flora of San Luis Potosí
Endemic flora of Mexico
Plants described in 1879
Taxa named by Asa Gray